Mendon is a city in western Chariton County, Missouri, United States.  The population was 163 at the 2020 census.

History
Mendon was laid out in 1871 by Christopher Shupe. However, the area had previously had some homes, and businesses were in operation in the area several years prior to the town plat actually being filed. Among the earliest was a general store built around 1865 by Mr. Bostich and Mr. Eastman. In 1867, Jeremiah Andrews Felt, of Quincy, Adams County, Illinois, sent his twin sons, William Winsor Felt and Winslow Leach Felt, aged 22, with their 16-year-old brother George Washington Felt, to establish farms to the northwest of where the town would be laid out four years later. George went to Iowa and the twins acquired 320 acres from the Hannibal & St. Joseph Railroad, and were named as "farmers and stock-raisers being among the first settlers of the area.” 

Winslow Leach, his wife Annetta Brown, and son Arthur Stanley died, and Charles Davis Felt, the youngest of the Felt brothers, came from Illinois to settle in 1880. He married Lydia McCarl, and they raised a son, Chester Arthur, and daughter, Adriana Francis. After the town moved, the family sold portions of its land upon which the high school was built.

With the coming of the  Chicago, Santa Fe and California Railroad in the 1880s, the citizens of Mendon were faced with a monumental choice. The rail line was projected to pass by, over a mile away. Thus when the railroad tracks were laid in 1887 and 1888, a new Mendon was created at the current site, and the former location was mostly abandoned.

By 1899 the community contained over 20 stores, a school, a bank, and two hotels. A newspaper, the Mendon Citizen, was first published in 1886. The estimated population in the late 1890s was 350 residents.

On June 27, 2022, Amtrak's Southwest Chief derailed nearly a mile southwest of Mendon, after hitting a dump truck.

Today
Although the Santa Fe railroad still passes through regularly, little remains of Mendon's business community.

Education for the town and surrounding rural area is provided by Northwestern High School. The school's athletic and academic teams compete in Missouri Class 1, the smallest of all classifications.

Mendon's proximity to the Swan Lake National Wildlife Refuge has proven a source of income for the community, with business catering to waterfowl hunters who come to the region.

Geography
Mendon is located in western Chariton County on Missouri Route 11. Yellow Creek flows past the northwest side of the town and the Swan Lake National Wildlife Refuge is two miles west. The Atchison Topeka and Santa Fe Railroad line passes the northwest side of the community. This line is now owned by the BNSF Railway as the Southern Transcon. The Amtrak Southwest Chief passes through without stopping.

Demographics

2010 census
As of the census of 2010, there were 171 people, 81 households, and 48 families living in the city. The racial makeup of the city was 98.8% White and 1.2% African American.

There were 81 households, of which 23.5% had children under the age of 18 living with them, 53.1% were married couples living together, 4.9% had a female householder with no husband present, 1.2% had a male householder with no wife present, and 40.7% were non-families. 35.8% of all households were made up of individuals, and 19.8% had someone living alone who was 65 years of age or older. The average household size was 2.11 and the average family size was 2.73.

The median age in the city was 40.5 years. 21.1% of residents were under the age of 18; 8.7% were between the ages of 18 and 24; 24.5% were from 25 to 44; 19.9% were from 45 to 64; and 25.7% were 65 years of age or older. The gender makeup of the city was 46.2% male and 53.8% female.

2000 census
As of the census of 2000, there were 208 people, 92 households, and 57 families living in the city. The population density was 1,171.6 people per square mile (446.2/km2). There were 115 housing units at an average density of 647.7 per square mile (246.7/km2). The racial makeup of the city was 98.08% White, 0.48% Native American, and 1.44% from two or more races.

There were 92 households, out of which 31.5% had children under the age of 18 living with them, 55.4% were married couples living together, 5.4% had a female householder with no husband present, and 38.0% were non-families. 35.9% of all households were made up of individuals, and 18.5% had someone living alone who was 65 years of age or older. The average household size was 2.26 and the average family size was 3.00.  There are an average of 7.4 dogs per capita in this city and they are free to run wild around the town.

In the city the population was spread out, with 25.0% under the age of 18, 8.7% from 18 to 24, 26.0% from 25 to 44, 23.6% from 45 to 64, and 16.8% who were 65 years of age or older. The median age was 38 years. For every 100 females, there were 84.1 males. For every 100 females age 18 and over, there were 81.4 males.

The median income for a household in the city was $31,875, and the median income for a family was $33,281. Males had a median income of $32,969 versus $15,417 for females. The per capita income for the city was $14,537. About 6.3% of families and 7.6% of the population were below the poverty line, including 10.3% of those under the age of eighteen and 7.1% of those 65 or over.

Notable people
 Mendon is the hometown of former MLB pitcher Vern Kennedy, who is buried at Old Mendon Cemetery.

References

External links
 Historic maps of Mendon in the Sanborn Maps of Missouri Collection at the University of Missouri

Cities in Chariton County, Missouri
Cities in Missouri